Archerwill is a village in the Canadian province of Saskatchewan within the Rural Municipality of Barrier Valley No. 397 and Census Division No. 14. Since 1981 Archerwill has been the administrative centre of the RM of Barrier Valley.

History 
The community is named, in a syllabic abbreviation, after the secretary-treasurer and two councilors of the executive governing council of the RM of Barrier Valley in 1924. They were: Archie Campbell and Ervie Hanson, councilors; and William Pierce, secretary-treasurer. Archerwill incorporated as a village on January 1, 1947.

Archerwill is located on the Wadena-to-Tisdale branch line of the Canadian Pacific Railway. However, the nearly 55-year-old railway station was torn down in the early 1980s; and the nearly 60-year-old Saskatchewan Wheat Pool and UGG elevators were torn down in the 1990s.

The Archerwill Café (probably built in the late 1920s), most recently operating as Diner Thirty Five, burned down in a fire on June 23, 2016.

Demographics 

Attractions 
Archerwill has a post office, an indoor ice skating rink with attached curling sheets, a community hall with an attached small public library, and a "Senior Citizens' Centre" social hall.

Education 
Archerwill has an elementary school.

See also 
List of communities in Saskatchewan
List of villages in Saskatchewan

References

 Pederson, Laurette, ed. (1984). The Past to the Present. North Battleford, Saskatchewan: Turner-Warwick Publications Inc.
 

Villages in Saskatchewan
Barrier Valley No. 397, Saskatchewan
Division No. 14, Saskatchewan